Belfeld is a village in the Dutch province of Limburg. It is a part of the municipality of Venlo, and lies about 8 km southwest of the city center of Venlo, between the river Meuse and the border with Germany.

In 2001, Belfeld had 4856 inhabitants. The built-up area of the town was 1.59 km², and contained 1937 residences.

In 2001 Belfeld was merged into the municipality of Venlo.

References

Boroughs of Venlo
Former municipalities of Limburg (Netherlands)
Populated places in Limburg (Netherlands)
Municipalities of the Netherlands disestablished in 2001